Talas Integrated Reserve is a nature and game reserve located in Bakay-Ata District and Talas District of Talas Region of Kyrgyzstan. It lies on the north slopes of the Talas Alatoo mountain range, and covers the basins of the rivers Karabuura, Kümüshtak and Ürmaral (all left tributaries of the river Talas). Established in 1973, it covers 130 thousand hectares.

References

Protected areas of Kyrgyzstan
Protected areas established in 1986